Comaroff is a surname. Notable people with the surname include:

Jean Comaroff (born 1947), South African anthropologist, wife of John
John Comaroff (born 1945), South African anthropologist